Karina Habšudová and Andrea Strnadová defeated Nicole Pratt and Kirrily Sharpe in the final, 6–3, 6–2 to win the girls' doubles tennis title at the 1990 Wimbledon Championships.

Seeds
The top 2 seeds received a bye into the second round.

  Kristin Godridge /  Noëlle van Lottum (semifinals)
  Nicole Pratt /  Kirrily Sharpe (final)
  Karina Habšudová /  Andrea Strnadová (champions)
  Carrie Cunningham /  Erika deLone (first round, withdrew)
  Catherine Barclay /  Louise Stacey (quarterfinals)
  Tatiana Ignatieva /  Irina Sukhova (quarterfinals)
  Catarina Bernstein /  Pernille Sørensen (second round)
  Justine Hodder /  Virginia Humphreys-Davies (quarterfinals)

Draw

Finals

Top half

Bottom half

References

External links

Girls' Doubles
1990